Sir Jack Cecil Drummond FRIC, FRS (12 January 1891 – 4/5 August 1952), known as a child as Jack Cecil Spinks, was a distinguished biochemist, noted for his work on nutrition as applied to the British diet under rationing during the Second World War. He was murdered, together with his wife and 10-year-old daughter, in what became known as the Dominici affair, on the night of 4–5 August 1952 near Lurs, a village or commune in the Basses-Alpes department (now Alpes-de-Haute-Provence) of Southern France.

Early life and family background 
Jack Drummond was born either in Leicester, or London, likely Newington or Kennington. He was the son of Colonel John Drummond of the Royal Horse Artillery and Nora Gertrude McQuie, who had resided at 65 Howard Road, Clarendon Park, Leicester. John Drummond died at age 55, only three months after Jack's birth. Jack was adopted and raised by a paternal aunt, Maria Spinks, who lived in nearby Charlton. Maria's husband, George, was a retired captain quartermaster, who had seen action in the Crimea. According to author/biographer James Fergusson, life could not have been much fun for the solitary boy in the elderly couple's home. He attended The John Roan School in Greenwich and King's College School.

Drummond's family origins remain unclear. No birth certificate exists for him in the Family Records Office. His father John, the major, describes himself as a bachelor in his will, which makes no mention of a son. In the 1891 census, Jack's name was given as "Cecil", his mother's as "Gertrude Drummond", and her age as 29. It is not known what happened to Gertrude (presumably Nora Gertrude McQuie) or whether she was ever married to John. In the 1901 census, his name is recorded as Jack Cecil Spinks, taking his adoptive mother's surname. It is likely that as a boy Jack used the surname Spinks to avoid social embarrassment to his adoptive parents, but reverted to the surname Drummond sometime during his teens.

On 17 July 1915, Drummond married Mable Helen Straw, who had also been an undergraduate at East London College. Their marriage lasted 24 years until in 1939 it broke up because of Drummond's affair with his secretary and co-author, Anne Wilbraham (born 10 December 1907). Jack and Anne married on 15 June 1940. Their only child, Elizabeth, was born on 23 March 1942.

Scientific career 

After graduating with First Class honours in chemistry in 1912 at East London College (now Queen Mary University of London), Jack Drummond became a research assistant in the department of physiology at King's College London, working under Otto Rosenheim and the professor W.D. Halliburton. In 1914 he moved to the Cancer Hospital Research Institute where he worked with Casimir Funk who had coined the word vitamine (from vital amine). This was when Drummond first became interested in nutrition.

In 1917, Halliburton invited Drummond to join him in experimental work on substitutes for butter and margarine. As a result of this work, fat-soluble vitamins became one of his major fields of interest. It also led him to the study of practical problems of human nutrition and, in 1918, he published a paper in The Lancet on infant feeding.

In 1919, he moved to University College London (UCL) to work on physiological chemistry, the precursor to modern biochemistry. In 1920, he proposed that the "vital substances" discovered by Elmer Verner McCollum and by Casimir Funk should be called Vitamins A and B respectively, to contrast them with his proposed anti-scurvy factor, Vitamin C. He also dropped the final "e" from Funk's designation, because not all vitamins contain an amine group. In 1922 at the early age of 31, he became the first Professor of Biochemistry at UCL and held that position until 1945 (in absentia from 1939). He was also Dean of the Faculty of Medical Sciences from 1929 to 1932.

In the 1930s, he succeeded in isolating pure vitamin A with the assistance of young researcher M. B. Donald. Also in the 1930s, he became increasingly aware of the need to apply the new science of nutrition in practice. This awareness, combined with his interest in gastronomy, led him to study the English diet over the previous 500 years. He published the results of this study as the book—co-authored with his future second wife Anne Wilbraham—The Englishman's Food: A History of Five Centuries of English Diet in 1939.

The Ministry of Food consulted him on the gas contamination of food at the outbreak of war and, on 16 October 1939, appointed him chief adviser on food contamination. Drummond interested himself in the various scientific aspects of the ministry's work and urged the creation of a co-ordinating unit within the ministry with a scientific liaison officer in charge.

On 1 February 1940, he was appointed Scientific Adviser to the Ministry of Food. When Lord Woolton became Minister of Food in April 1940, Drummond produced a plan for the distribution of food based on "sound nutritional principles". He recognised that rationing was the perfect opportunity to attack what he called "dietetic ignorance" and that, if successful, he would be able not just to maintain but to improve the nation's health.

Thanks to Drummond's advice, the effect of rationing was to introduce more protein and vitamins to the diet of the poorest in society, while the better off were obliged to cut their consumption of meat, fats, sugar, and eggs. Follow-up studies after the war showed that, despite rationing and the stresses of war, the population's health had improved.
Drummond was Fullerian Professor of Physiology and Comparative Anatomy at the Royal Institution from 1941 to 1944. He was elected Fellow of the Royal Society on 16 March 1944 and was knighted in the same year.

In 1944, Drummond became an adviser on nutrition to Supreme Headquarters Allied Expeditionary Force and in 1945 to the allied control commissions for Germany and Austria. Also in 1945, he joined Boots Pure Drug Company as Director of Research, but remained seconded to the Ministry of Food until 1946. He was succeeded as Chief Scientific Advisor by Norman Charles Wright.

Drummond's career move to Boots at Nottingham was surprising to many of his former colleagues. It was also surprising that a man who had publicly advocated the exhaustive testing of new agrochemicals should have been responsible for the development of possibly harmful products such as Cornox, based on Dichlorprop, one of the chlorine-based phenoxy family of hormone weed-killers descended from ICI's wartime invention MCPA. Concerns about the lack of data on the toxicity of Dichlorprop led to its withdrawal from the UK market in 2003.
On the other hand, Drummond's successor as Boots's director of research, Gordon Hobday, described Drummond as "an altruist" who had committed substantial research resources into cures for tropical diseases. Hobday had quickly cancelled this research, saying "there was never any money in it."

Murder 

On the evening of 4 August 1952, while on holiday in France in their green Hillman estate car, the Drummonds stopped by the side of the N96 main road, less than 200 metres from a farmhouse called La Grand'Terre. The site is marked by a milestone as exactly 6 km south of Peyruis and 6 km north of La Brillanne. A footpath leads from the site down to the banks of the river Durance.

La Grand'Terre was the home of the Dominicis, a family of Franco-Italian peasant farmers: the patriarch Gaston, his wife Marie, their son Gustave, Gustave's wife Yvette, and their baby son Alain. It was Gustave who claimed to have found the three dead bodies around 5:30 am on the morning of 5 August, and who flagged down a passing motorcyclist, Jean-Marie Olivier, telling him to fetch the police.

Anne's body was found near the car. Jack's lay on the other side of the N96, covered by a camp bed. They had both been shot by a Rock-Ola M1 carbine. The body of 10-year-old Elizabeth was found 77 metres away, down the path leading to the river, on the other side of the bridge over the railway. Her head had been brutally smashed in by the stock of the rifle. The barrel of the murder weapon was soon found in the river, with the stock a short distance downstream. It is likely that the force of the blow or blows used to kill Elizabeth had also broken the stock off the rifle.

The Drummonds are buried in the cemetery of the tourist town of Forcalquier, about 11 km west of Lurs. Near the stone bridge over the railway, a cross with children's votive offerings marks the spot where Elizabeth's body was found.

Aftermath 
Gaston Dominici was convicted of the murders in November 1954 and sentenced to death by guillotine. However, both the police investigation and the conduct of the trial had been widely criticised and, after two inconclusive inquiries, President René Coty commuted the sentence to life imprisonment. Coty was succeeded in 1959 by President Charles de Gaulle, who ordered Dominici's release on humanitarian grounds, but did not pardon him, nor grant his request for a retrial.
Alain Dominici, a baby at the time of the murders, has spent a lifetime campaigning for the innocence of his grandfather.

The murders remain a subject of hot dispute to this day in France, where they are referred to as l'Affaire Dominici. The same name was used for a 1955 British television documentary directed by Orson Welles, and for a 1973 film by Claude Bernard-Aubert.

Awards and honours 
 1918 D.Sc. from University of London
 1944 knighted
 1944 elected FRS
 1946 Commander (Civil Division) of the Order of Orange-Nassau
 1946 elected Honorary Member of the New York Academy of Sciences
 1947 Lasker Group Award of the APHA
 1948 honorary doctorate from University of Paris
 United States Medal of Freedom with Silver Palms

See also 
 List of biochemists

Notes

Citations

Works cited 

 

 (audio available from this page)
 (Comic, 64pp)

1891 births
1952 deaths
Academics of King's College London
Academics of University College London
Alumni of King's College London
Alumni of Queen Mary University of London
British biochemists
British murder victims
British people murdered abroad
Deaths by firearm in France
Fellows of the Royal Institute of Chemistry
Fellows of the Royal Society
Fullerian Professors of Physiology
Knights Bachelor
People educated at the John Roan School
People murdered in France
Vitamin researchers